Abbasqulular (also, Abbaskullar) is a village in the Tovuz Rayon of Azerbaijan.  The village forms part of the municipality of Çeşməli.

References

External links 
Satellite map at Maplandia.com

Populated places in Tovuz District